Kings Creek is an unincorporated community in Hancock County, West Virginia, United States. It lies at an elevation of 692 feet (211 m).

References

Unincorporated communities in Hancock County, West Virginia
Unincorporated communities in West Virginia